Sharkari's bent-toed gecko (Cyrtodactylus sharkari) is a species of lizard in the family Gekkonidae. The species is endemic to Peninsular Malaysia.

Etymology
The specific name, sharkari, is in honor of Indonesian politician Mohd Sharkar Shamsudin for his work in conservation.

Geographic range
C. sharkari is found in northeastern Peninsular Malaysia, in the federal state of Pahang.

Habitat
The preferred natural habitats of C. sharkari are forest and rocky areas.

Description

Reproduction
The mode of reproduction of C. sharkari is unknown.

References

Further reading
Grismer LL, Quah ESH (2019). "An updated and annotated checklist of the lizards of Peninsular Malaysia, Singapore, and their adjacent archipelagos". Zootaxa 4545 (2): 230–248.
Grismer LL, Wood PL, Anuar S, Quah ESH, Muin MA, Mohamed M, Onn CK, Sumarli AX, Loredo AI, Heinz HM (2014). "The phylogenetic relationships of three new species of the Cyrtodactylus pulchellus complex (Squamata: Gekkonidae) from poorly explored regions in northeastern Peninsular Malaysia". Zootaxa 3786 (3): 359–381. (Cyrtodactylus sharkari, new species).

Cyrtodactylus
Reptiles described in 2014